Georgetown American University is a private healthcare-oriented university in Georgetown, Guyana established in 2013.

The first students enrolled in June 2014, and their first graduation was 2018.

Accreditation
GAU is registered with the National Accreditation Council of Guyana. It is listed in FAIMER International Medical Education Directory (IMED) and World Directory of Medical Schools. The university is certified International Standard Organisation (ISO) 9001-2015 compliant for producing Medical Professionals and Emergency Technicians.

Programs offered
GAU currently offers the following programs:  
 Doctor of Medicine - 4-year program 
 Associate of Science in Premedical Sciences
 Associate of Science in Nursing 
 Bachelor of Science in Nursing 
 Associate of Science Degree in Cybersecurity 
 Bachelor of Science in Cybersecurity

Affiliations
The university is affiliated with the hospitals and medical training institutions in Guyana and the USA. A list is provided below: 
 Wyckoff Hospital - Brooklyn, New York 
 Piedmont Eastside Medical Center, Snellville, GA 
 Caribbean Heart Institute - Georgetown
 Georgetown Public Hospital, Georgetown

Location
GAU main Campus is in Guyana, South America offices in the United States:
 Guyana Campus - 81 Croal Street, Georgetown Guyana 
 Clinical Sciences Office - 1 West Court Square, Suite 763, Decatur, GA 30030, USA
 Information Office USA - 17927 Shotley Bridge Place, Olney, Maryland 20832 USA

See also
 International medical graduate
 List of medical schools in the Caribbean

References

Higher education in Guyana
Medical schools in the Caribbean
Medical schools in Guyana
Universities in Guyana